Minuscule 324 (in the Gregory-Aland numbering), ε 452 (Soden), is a Greek minuscule manuscript of the New Testament, on parchment. Paleographically it has been assigned to the 14th century.
The margin apparatus is full. The manuscript was prepared for Church reading.

Description 

The codex contains the text of the four Gospels on 170 parchment leaves. The text is written in one column per page, in 29 lines per page.

There is also another division according to the Ammonian Sections, with references to the Eusebian Canons (written below Ammonian Section numbers).

Synaxarion, Menologion, and list of Caesars were added by a later hand.

To the same manuscript belongs lectionary 97 (folios 1-145).

Text 

The Greek text of the codex is a representative of the Byzantine text-type. Hermann von Soden classified it to the textual family Kx. Aland placed it in Category V.
According to the Claremont Profile Method it represents Kx in Luke 1, Luke 10, and Luke 20.

History 

The manuscript formerly belonged to Cardinal Mazarin (as minuscule 14, 305, 311, 313).

It was added to the list of New Testament manuscripts by Scholz (1794-1852). 
It was examined and described by Scholz (major part of it), Paulin Martin. C. R. Gregory saw the manuscript in 1885.

The manuscript is currently housed at the Bibliothèque nationale de France (Gr. 376, fol. 146-315) at Paris.

See also 

 List of New Testament minuscules
 Biblical manuscript
 Textual criticism

References

Further reading 

 

Greek New Testament minuscules
14th-century biblical manuscripts
Bibliothèque nationale de France collections